The 2022–23 season is the 55th season of the Northern Premier League. The league consists of four divisions, the Premier Division at Step 3 of the National League System, and the West, East and Midlands divisions at Step 4. The NPL continued this season with main sponsors Entain's Pitching In.

The allocations for Step 4 this season were announced by The Football Association (FA) on 12 May 2022.

Premier Division

Team changes
The following 6 clubs left the Premier Division before the season:
 Basford United – transferred to the Southern League Premier Division Central
 Buxton – promoted to the National League North
 Grantham Town – relegated to Division One East
 Scarborough Athletic – promoted to the National League North
 Mickleover – transferred to the Southern League Premier Division Central
 Witton Albion – relegated to Division One West

The following 6 clubs joined the division before the season:
 Belper Town – promoted from Division One Midlands
 Guiseley – relegated from the National League North
 Liversedge – promoted from Division One East
 Marine – promoted from Division One West
 Marske United – promoted from Division One East
 Warrington Rylands 1906 – promoted from Division One West

Premier Division table

Top goalscorers

Updated to match(es) played on 18 March 2023.

Results table

Play-offs

Semi-finals

Final

Stadiums and locations

Division One West

Team changes
The following 4 clubs left Division One West before the season:
 Kendal Town – relegated to the North West Counties League Premier Division
 Marine – promoted to the Premier Division
 Market Drayton Town – relegated to the Midland Football League Premier Division
 Warrington Rylands 1906 – promoted to the Premier Division

The following 4 clubs joined the division before the season:
 Hanley Town – promoted from the Midland League Premier Division
 Macclesfield – promoted from the North West Counties League Premier Division
 Skelmersdale United – promoted from the North West Counties League Premier Division
 Witton Albion – relegated from the Premier Division

Division One West table

Top goalscorers

Updated to match(es) played on 4 March 2023.

Results table

Play-offs

Semi-finals

Final

Stadia and locations

Division One East

Division One East comprises 20 teams, one more than the previous season.

Team changes
The following 5 clubs left Division One East before the season:
 Frickley Athletic – relegated to the Northern Counties East League Premier Division
 Liversedge – promoted to the Premier Division
 Marske United – promoted to the Premier Division
 Pickering Town – relegated to the Northern League Division One
 Yorkshire Amateur – relegated to the Northern Counties East League Premier Division
 
The following 6 clubs joined the division before the season:
 Carlton Town – transferred from Division One Midlands
 Consett – promoted from the Northern League Division One
 Grantham Town – relegated from the Premier Division
 Grimsby Borough – promoted from the Northern Counties East League Premier Division
 Long Eaton United – promoted from the United Counties League Premier Division North
 North Shields – promoted from the Northern League Division One

Division One East table

Top goalscorers

Updated to match(es) played on 18 March 2023.

Results table

Play-offs

Semi-finals

Final

Stadia and locations

Division One Midlands

Team changes
The following 6 clubs left Division One Midlands before the season:
 Belper Town – promoted to the Premier Division
 Carlton Town – transferred to Division One East
 Histon – relegated to the United Counties League Premier Division South
 Ilkeston Town – promoted to the Southern League Premier Division Central
 Soham Town Rangers – relegated to the Eastern Counties League Premier Division
 Wisbech Town – relegated to the United Counties League Premier Division South

The following 6 clubs joined the division before the season:
 Boldmere St Michaels – promoted from the Midland League Premier Division
 Dereham Town – transferred from the Isthmian League North Division
 Gresley Rovers – promoted from the United Counties League Premier Division North
 Harborough Town – promoted from the United Counties League Premier Division South
 Hinckley LRFC – promoted from the United Counties League Premier Division South
 St Neots Town – transferred from the Southern League Division One Central

Division One Midlands table

Top goalscorers

Updated to match(es) played on 7 March 2023.

Results table

Play-off

Semi-finals

Final

Stadia and locations

Challenge Cup
For the third successive season, it was announced to member clubs that the League Challenge Cup was cancelled.

See also
Northern Premier League
2022–23 Isthmian League
2022–23 Southern League

Notes

References

External links
Official website

Northern Premier League seasons
7